Liberty High School, alternately referred to as Liberty-Raleigh or Liberty of Raleigh, is a consolidated high school in rural Raleigh County, West Virginia, located in the town of Glen Daniel, West Virginia. The names of Liberty and its sister school and rival Independence High School reflect the fact they were both built in 1976, the U.S. Bicentennial. Liberty was always intended to incorporate the previous Trap Hill, Clear Fork, and Marsh Fork high schools, but legal wrangling kept the later two from consolidation until the 1990s. Liberty currently has over 500 students. The school nickname is Raiders and its colors are red, black, and white.

References

External links
 Liberty High School

Public high schools in West Virginia
Buildings and structures in Raleigh County, West Virginia
Education in Raleigh County, West Virginia